Șoimii Sibiu (Falcons Sibiu) was a football team from Sibiu. They were founded in 1913 and disappeared in 2001.

They were a main team in Sibiu, being four times regional champions of Sibiu. Their best pre-war performance was defeating the 6-time-in-a-row champion Chinezul Timişoara in 1927–28 quarter-finals. But after that they forfeited their semi-final tie against Jiul Lupeni.

They also played three seasons in the Divizia A : 1932–33, 1933–34, 1950, but without notable performances.

Chronology of names

Honours

Liga II:
Winners (1): 1948–49
Runners-up (7): 1935–36, 1947–48, 1973–74, 1974–75, 1975–76, 1983–84, 1984–85

Liga III:
Winners (1): 1989–90

Liga IV – Sibiu County:
Winners (2): 1993–94, 1994–95

References

External links
 Șoimii Sibiu on romaniansoccer.ro

Association football clubs established in 1913
Association football clubs disestablished in 2001
Defunct football clubs in Romania
Football clubs in Sibiu County
Sibiu
1913 establishments in Austria-Hungary